Nara Sada Ishq Aye is the seventh, and to date the latest, album of Pakistani pop and bhangra singer Abrar-ul-Haq. It was released on March, 2007.

The song "Parveen" from this album became a subject of controversy when the Supreme Court of Pakistan summoned an explanation from Abrar-ul-Haq, alleging that it used the name Parveen in a derogatory manner that would hurt the sentiments of society. Abrar-ul-Haq told reporters the song referred to "Parmeen"; the song title "Permeen" is shown on versions of the album that are available.

Track listing
"Rano Khiza Mix" (feat. Cheshire Cat)
"Parveen" (Alternative title: "Permeen")
"Jatt"
"Naraa Sada Ishq Aey"
"Saanso Mein"
"Patlo"
"Run Babay Di"
"Mela"
"Maan"
"Alif Allah"

Awards and nominations
Nominated for Best Album of the Year at 7th Lux Style Awards held in 2008

External links 
 Abrar-ul-Haq's Official Website
 Listen to Naara Sada Iahq Aey

References 

2007 albums
Abrar-ul-Haq albums